Siriroj Rathprasert (born 8 November 1975) is a Thai fencer. He competed in the individual épée event at the 2004 Summer Olympics.

References

External links
 

1975 births
Living people
Siriroj Rathprasert
Siriroj Rathprasert
Fencers at the 2004 Summer Olympics
Southeast Asian Games medalists in fencing
Siriroj Rathprasert
Siriroj Rathprasert
Competitors at the 2001 Southeast Asian Games
Siriroj Rathprasert